Fish house punch is a strong, rum-based punch containing rum, cognac, and peach brandy. The drink is typically served over an ice block in a punch bowl and garnished with lemon slices.

History
It is held to have been first concocted in 1732 at Philadelphia's fishing club, the State in Schuylkill, also known as the "fish house".

A 1744 note by the secretary of an embassy of Virginia Commissioners contains what may be the earliest record of the punch. Meeting local notables at the Schuylkill River in Philadelphia, he described being served "a Bowl of fine Lemon Punch big enough to have Swimmed half a dozen of young Geese."

America's first president, George Washington, indulged in thirteen toasts one for each state during a victory celebration at New York's Fraunces Tavern, and it is said that after he partook of fish house punch at Philadelphia's State in Schuylkill, he couldn't bring himself to make an entry in his diary for the following three days.

The State in Schuylkill fish house Punch is traditionally made in a large bowl that did double duty as a baptismal font for citizens' infants. "Its an ample space . . . . . would indeed admit of total immersion," one citizen noted.

The "fish house" is said to have been a gentlemen's club devoted to cigars, whiskey, and the occasional fishing foray upon the Chesapeake or upon the Restigouche River in Canada. Another version states that it was created in 1848 by Shippen Willing of Philadelphia, to celebrate the momentous occasion of women being allowed into the premises of the "fish house" for the first time in order to enliven the annual Christmas party. It was supposed to be just "something to please the ladies' palate but get them livelier than is their usual wont."

The punch, which contains rum, cognac, and peach brandy, is potent, so it is normally diluted with cold black tea, a common mixer for this particular punch, or with seltzer water. Some punch bowls may not be large enough to accommodate the large ice block called for, and though the block is a classic part of this recipe, it can, of course, be simply served in a pitcher over ice cubes.

Ingredients
1 cup sugar
3½ cups water
1½ cups fresh lemon juice (6 to 8 lemons), strained
1 (750-ml) bottle Jamaican amber rum
 cognac
 peach brandy
Garnish: lemon slices

Preparation
Stir together sugar and 3½ cups water in a large bowl or pot until sugar is dissolved. Add lemon juice, rum, cognac, and brandy and chill, covered, at least 3 hours. Put half-gallon ice block in a punch bowl and pour punch over it.

See also

Ti' punch, a rum-based mixed drink that is especially popular in French-speaking Caribbean states

References

External links
The New York Times: "How Fishhouse Punch is Made.; Ingredients of the State in Schuylkill's Seductive Concoction." (May 24, 1896)
The New York Times: "Oldest Dining Club in the World;; The State in Schwylkill, Founded in 1732, Still Holds Its Annual Dinner in Its Castle Near Philadelphia All Cooking Is Done by Members, and Each Must Take His Turn at It." (January 15, 1905)
Fish House Punch on Foodista

Cuisine of Philadelphia
Cocktails with rum
Cocktails with brandy
1732 establishments in the Thirteen Colonies
Historical foods in American cuisine